Lempicka is a musical based on the life of Polish painter Tamara de Lempicka with music by Matt Gould, lyrics by Carson Kreitzer, with a book by Gould and Kreitzer from an original concept by Kreitzer.

Synopsis 
The musical follows the life of de Lempicka as she flees the Russian Revolution to Paris, France with her husband, Tadeusz, and daughter, Kizette. Facing the rise of fascism, Tamara takes to painting to survive, and when she meets the free-spirited Rafaela, a prostitute on the fringes of Parisian society, she's torn between the life she cherishes with her husband and the passion, ambition, and possibility awoken in her by her new muse.

Productions
The musical was originally commissioned by Yale Repertory Theatre and New Dramatists. Between 2011 and 2017, the musical underwent a series of labs and workshops.

The musical premiered at the Williamstown Theatre Festival on July 20, 2018, running through August 1, 2018. The show is choreographed by Raja Feather Kelly and directed by Rachel Chavkin. The production made its West Coast premiere on June 14, 2022 at La Jolla Playhouse, running until July 24.

Musical numbers

Act I
"Opening"
"Our Time"
"Starting Over"
"Paris"
"Burn It Up"
"Time/Two Paintings"
"The Exchange"
"A New Vision for the Future"
"Stillness"
"L’Amour Fou"
"My Kingdom"
"Woman Is"

Act II
"The Grind"
"The New Woman"
"The Most Beautiful Bracelet"
"Adam and Eve"
"What She Sees"
"New Vision (Reprise) "
"Spinning"
"Women"
"Speed"
"I’d Like Him to Remember Me"
"The Time I Didn’t Know You"
"The New Woman (Reprise) "
"Brush and Oils"
"Blasted California Sun"
"Finale"

Characters and original cast

References

2018 musicals
Biographical musicals
Musicals inspired by real-life events
Cultural depictions of 20th-century painters
Cultural depictions of Polish women